The Plague (original title: La Peste) is a 1992 Argentine-French-British drama film written and directed by Luis Puenzo and starring William Hurt, Sandrine Bonnaire, Robert Duvall and Raul Julia. It is based on the novel La Peste by Albert Camus. It entered the competition at the 49th Venice International Film Festival.

Plot    
Set in the 1990s (Camus's novel was set in 1940s), 'The Plague' tells the story of Dr. Bernard Rieux. The film takes place in the city of Oran, where several cases of plague have been recorded. At first, the authorities want to hide the disease from the population, but the news ends up reaching the citizens. Oran is in quarantine and the army surrounds the entire city, preventing anyone from getting in or getting out.

Cast
 William Hurt as Dr. Bernard Rieux
 Sandrine Bonnaire as Martine Rambert 
 Jean-Marc Barr as Jean Tarrou 
 Robert Duvall as Joseph Grand 
 Raul Julia as Cottard 
 Jorge Luz as Old Man With The Cats
 Victoria Tennant as Alicia Rieux 
 Atilio Veronelli as Dr. Horacio
 Francisco Cocuzza as Miguel
 Laura Palmucci as Miguel's Wife
 Norman Erlich as Dr. Castel
 Marcos Woinsky as Dr. Grunewald
 Duilio Marzio as Judge Orbon
 Pancho Ibáñez as Newscaster
 Horacio Fontova as Attendant
 Bruno Chmelik as Felipe, Judge Orbon's Son
 Monica Tozer as Dr. Rieux's Receptionist
 Lautaro Murúa as Father Paneloux
 Peter McFarlane as Hoese
 Lidia Catalano as Sara
 Fabiana Uria as Teresa
 Norman Briski as The Preacher
 China Zorrilla as Emma Rieux
 Juana Hidalgo as Mr. Castel
 Silvina Chediek as Newscaster
 Verónica Llinás as Stripteaser

References

External links
 
 

1992 films
Argentine drama films
French drama films
1992 drama films
British drama films
Films based on French novels
Films based on works by Albert Camus
Films about infectious diseases
Films directed by Luis Puenzo
Films shot in Buenos Aires
Films scored by Vangelis
English-language Argentine films
English-language French films
1990s English-language films
1990s British films
1990s Argentine films
1990s French films